The Canadian Association of Blue Cross Plans (CABCP) is a federation of regional not-for-profit insurance providers in Canada. All providers that are members of CABCP, called "member plans", are independent entities which are overseen by the association to ensure consistent performance standards. The first Blue Cross Plan was offered to residents of Manitoba in 1939. The association is headquartered in Etobicoke, Ontario.

The CABCP is affiliated with the Blue Cross Blue Shield Association and the International Federation of Health Plans.

Member plans
 Alberta Blue Cross (Alberta and Northwest Territories)
 Canassurance Hospital Service Association
 Ontario Blue Cross (Ontario) - Etobicoke (c. 1941)
 Quebec Blue Cross  (Quebec) - Montreal (c. 1942)
 Manitoba Blue Cross (Manitoba and Nunavut) - Winnipeg
 Medavie Blue Cross - Moncton, NB - New Brunswick, Nova Scotia, Prince Edward Island, Newfoundland and Labrador (c. 1943)
 Pacific Blue Cross (BC and Yukon) - Burnaby, BC
 Saskatchewan Blue Cross (Saskatchewan) - Saskatoon (c. 1946)

References

External links
Official Website

Health insurance companies of Canada
Medical and health organizations based in Ontario